Copperas Mountain (sometimes called "Big Copperas Mountain") is a summit in the U.S. state of Ohio. 

Copperas Mountain was so named on account of deposits of copperas in the area.

References

Landforms of Ross County, Ohio
Mountains of Ohio